The Bofors 57 mm anti-tank gun was an anti-tank gun that was designed by Bofors during the mid 1940s and was designated the 57 mm Pvkan m/43. The gun was a scaled-up version of the 37 mm anti-tank  gun m/38. The gun armed the Panzerskyddkompanies (Panzer Protection Companies) of infantry regiments. However, the increased weight of the gun made it difficult to pull by hand in Sweden's rugged terrain. The gun could be fitted with a 20 mm sub-caliber training barrel for gunnery practice. When heavier tanks began to become common in the late 1940s, the gun was quickly relegated to other roles. The gun was replaced by the 9 cm pvp 1110 recoilless rifle and guided anti-tank missiles.

Variants 
 An experimental tank destroyer with a Pvkan m/43 that was mounted in a large square open-topped turret on the chassis of the Strv m/41 light tank and given the designation Pansarvärnskanonvagn III (Armor defense cannon car), or Pvkv III for short.  However, by the time it began testing increases in the armor protection of contemporary tanks led to the design of the related Pansarvärnskanonvagn II, or Pvkv II for short.  It used the same turret and chassis but was armed with a more powerfull lvkan m/37 A 75 mm gun.
 Another experimental tank destroyer with a fully enclosed turret based on the chassis of the Landsverk L-60 and designated Pansarvärnskanonvagn IV, or Pvkv IV for short was also tested but was also unsuccessful.

Armor Penetration

Gallery

References

Artillery of Sweden
World War II anti-tank guns
57 mm artillery
Bofors
Military equipment introduced in the 1940s